The Governor of Madhesh Province is the nominal head of state of the Nepal state (province) of Madhesh Province and a representative of the President of Nepal. The governor is appointed by the term president for a term of five years. The governor's powers are mostly ceremonial and the executive powers of the governor are exercised by the chief minister of Madhesh Province, who is the head of the executive of the state government of Madhesh Province.  The following is a list of governors of Madhesh Province.

The incumbent, Hari Shankar Mishra, has served as the governor of Madhesh Province since 17 August 2021.

List of governors

See also 
Madhesh Province
Chief Minister of Madhesh Province
Leader of the Opposition in Madhesh Provincial Assembly

References 

Nepal government-related lists
Nepal politics-related lists
Provinces of Nepal-related lists